Shuen may refer to:

Shuen paper, also known as Xuan paper or Shuen paper or rice paper, is a kind of paper originating in ancient China used for writing and painting
Shuen Wan, also known as Plover Cove or Shuen Wan Hoi, a cove in the Tai Po area of Hong Kong, near Tolo Channel and Tolo Harbour
So Hung Shuen, also known as Soh Hang-suen, a former TVB actor
Tang Shu Shuen (born 1941), former Hong Kong film director
Wu Shuen-wen, also known as Vivian Shun-wen Wu, (1913–2008), prominent Taiwanese businesswoman

See also

Sho En
Shuowen
Shuwan
Zhu Wen